The United Soccer Coaches College Coach of the Year is an award given by the United Soccer Coaches (formerly National Soccer Coaches Association of America [NSCAA]) to one men's and one women's NCAA Division I collegiate coach each. The men's award began in 1973, and the women's award began in 1982.

The NSCAA was rebranded as United Soccer Coaches on August 2, 2017.

Key

Winners

References

External links 
 NSCAA College Coach of the Year

College soccer trophies and awards in the United States

US 2
Awards established in 1973
Awards established in 1982
United Soccer Coaches
1973 establishments in the United States